Donald Keith Bandler (April 1947 Philadelphia, Pennsylvania – February 24, 2017) was the American ambassador extraordinary and plenipotentiary to Cyprus from 1999 to 2002.

Bandler attended Harriton High School and Kenyon College (class of 1969) before teaching at The Key School from 1969 to 1971 (he taught history to juniors and seniors).  He earned an MA in Classics from St. John's College (Annapolis/Santa Fe) and a JD from George Washington University Law School in 1971.

References

See also
Donald Bandler '69 wins appointment as U.S. ambassador to Cyprus

1947 births
2017 deaths
People from Philadelphia
St. John's College (Annapolis/Santa Fe) alumni
Kenyon College alumni
George Washington University Law School alumni
Ambassadors of the United States to Cyprus
Harriton High School alumni